Archie Shepp discography.

Discography

As leader/co-leader

Compilations 
 Devil Blues (Circle, 1986) – including tracks from Frankfurt Workshop '78: Tenor Saxes
 Gemini (Archieball, 2007)[2CD] – recorded in 2002 and 2007
 Attica Blues Orchestra Live: I Hear The Sound (Archieball, 2013) – live recorded in 2012 ("Festival Jazz à La Villette") and 2013 ("CNCDC Châteauvallon" and "Festival Les Nuits")

As a member 
New York Contemporary Five
 Rufus (Fontana, 1963) – proto-NYCF, yet without Don Cherry
 Consequences (Fontana, 1963)
 New York Contemporary Five Vol. 1 (Storyville/Sonet, 1963)
 New York Contemporary Five Vol. 2 (Storyville/Sonet, 1963)
 Bill Dixon 7-tette/Archie Shepp and the New York Contemporary 5 (Savoy, 1964) – split album

As sideman 

With John Coltrane
A Love Supreme (Impulse!, 1965) – recorded in 1964
Ascension (Impulse!, 1966) – recorded in 1965
The Major Works of John Coltrane (GRP, 1992) – recorded in 1965

With Sunny Murray
 Sunshine (BYG, 1969)
 Homage to Africa (BYG, 1970) – recorded in 1969

With Cecil Taylor
The World of Cecil Taylor (Candid, 1961) – recorded in 1960
New York City R&B (Candid, 1961)
Jumpin' Punkins (Candid, 1971) – recorded in 1961
Air (Candid, 1988) – recorded in 1960
Cell Walk for Celeste (Candid, 1988) – recorded in 1961

With others
 Dave Burrell, Echo (BYG, 1969)
 Alan Silva, Luna Surface (BYG, 1969)
 Clifford Thornton, Ketchaoua (BYG, 1969)
 Art Matthews, It's Easy to Remember (Baystate, 1978) – recorded in 1979
 Siegfried Kessler Trio, Invitation (Sun, 1980) – recorded in 1979
 Material, One Down (Celluloid, 1982) – on "Memories", accompanying Whitney Houston on her debut as lead vocalist.
 Chet Baker, In Memory Of (L+R, 1988)
 Frank Zappa, You Can't Do That on Stage Anymore, Vol. 4 (Rykodisc, 1991) – live recorded in 1969-88
 Jeff Silvertrust Quintet, Hip Knossis (Bulldozers From Jupiter, 2001)
 Mina Agossi Red Eyes (Naïve, 2011)
 Joachim Kühn, Voodoo Sense (ACT, 2013) – recorded in 2011-12
 Alice Coltrane, Carnegie Hall '71 (Hi Hat, 2018)

External links
Discogs

Jazz discographies
Discographies of American artists